Jean de Beaurain (17 January 1696 – 12 February 1771) was a French geographer.

1696 births
1771 deaths
French geographers